Botteri is a surname. Notable people with the surname include:

 Giovanna Botteri (born 1957), Italian journalist
 Matteo Botteri (1808–1877), ornithologist and collector
 Stéphane Botteri (born 1962), French ice hockey player

Occupational surnames
Italian-language surnames